Qarehchi-ye Madan (also Romanized as Qarehchī-ye Ma‘dan; also known as Qarehchī-ye Ma‘danī) is a village in Nowjeh Mehr Rural District, Siah Rud District, Jolfa County, East Azerbaijan Province, Iran. At the 2006 census, its population was 43, in 10 families.

References 

Populated places in Jolfa County